Adlercreutzia rubneri is an anaerobic, Gram-positive and Rod-shaped bacterium from the genus of Adlercreutzia which has been isolated from human faeces. Adlercreutzia rubneri  is capable to metabolize resveratrol.

References

Coriobacteriia
Bacteria described in 2021